Bona is both a given name and a surname. Notable people with the name include:

Given name
 Bona of Pisa (c. 1156–1207), Italian saint
 Bona of Savoy (1449–1503), duchess of Savoy
 Princess Bona Margherita of Savoy-Genoa (1896–1971), Princess Konrad of Bavaria
 Bona Sforza (1493–1557), Queen of Poland and Grand Duchess of Lithuania
 Bona Tibertelli de Pisis (1926–2000), a painter, writer and poet who was married to André Pieyre de Mandiargues 
 Bona (born 1995), stage name for Kim Ji-yeon, part of South Korean Girl Group Cosmic Girls

Surname
 Adem Bona (born 2003), Nigerian-Turkish basketball player 
 Alberto Bona (born 1978), Italian actor and film maker
 André Bona (born 1990), French footballer
 Annalisa Bona (born 1982), Italian tennis player
 Damien Bona (1955–2012), American film historian
 Gino Bona (born 1973), American marketing professional
 Giovanni Bona (1609–1674), Cistercian cardinal and author
 Giovanni Serafino Bona (1591/92–1658), Croatian politician and poet
 Giovanni Leonardo Di Bona (1542–1587), Italian chess player
 Jerry L. Bona (born 1945), American mathematician
 Lee Bo-na (born 1981), South Korean sports shooter
 Luciano Dalla Bona, Italian cyclist
 Oscar De Bona (born 1948), Italian politician
 Pasquale Bona (1808–1878), Italian composer
 Richard Bona (born 1967), Cameroonian jazz musician and bassist
 Samuele Dalla Bona (born 1981), Italian footballer
 Stanislaus Bona (1888–1967), American Roman Catholic bishop
 Tommaso Bona, Italian Renaissance painter
 Valerio Bona (c. 1560c. 1620), Italian Baroque composer
 Vin Di Bona (born 1944), television producer